The Geisha is a 1914 American short silent film, directed by Raymond West and using music by Sidney Jones from the stage musical The Geisha. The film features Sessue Hayakawa, Tsuru Aoki, Frank Borzage, Ramona Radcliffe and Henry Kotani in important roles.

Cast
Sessue Hayakawa - Takura
Tsuru Aoki - Myo
Frank Borzage - Ensign John Carver
Ramona Radcliffe - Cecilia Ridgeway
Herbert Standing - Senator Ridgeway
Chester Withey - Lt. Blake
Gladys Brockwell
Henry Kotani

References

External links 
 

1914 films
Silent American drama films
1914 drama films
American black-and-white films
1914 short films
Films about geisha
American silent short films
1910s English-language films
Films directed by Raymond B. West
1910s American films